3d studio can refer to:
 A studio location where 3D work is created
 3ds Max, an animation software package previously named 3D Studio Max
 Any 3D computer graphics software